Prince Vasily Danilovich Kholmsky (1460s – 1524) was a Russian boyar and Muscovite voyevoda, son-in-law of Grand Prince Ivan III and son of Prince Daniil Kholmsky.

Vasily Kholmsky was a Muscovite nobleman. During the Novgorod campaigns of 1492 and 1495, he was one of the commanders of the so-called Big Regiment and was noted by Ivan III for his bravery in combat. Ivan would soon admit him to his circle of friends and royal court. In 1500, the grand prince arranged a marriage between Vasily Kholmsky (who was a descendant of appanage princes of Tver) and his second daughter Feodosiya Ivanovna (died February 19, 1501) and bestowed the title of a boyar upon Vasily. In 1502, Vasily Kholmsky and Dmitry Ivanovich (son of Ivan III) successfully fought side by side against the Lithuanians in the Smolensk region.

In 1505-1506, Kholmsky was in charge of the Big Regiment and was ordered to protect Murom and then Nizhny Novgorod. In 1507, he suffered a bitter defeat from the Tatars near Kazan, only to be sent there once again with a large army to suppress the citizens of that city. In September of that same year, Kholmsky defeated the Lithuanian army near Mstislavl, Polotsk, and a few other localities. In 1509, the Luthuanians invaded Muscovy once again and defeated the army sent from Moscow. Upon hearing this news, Kholmsky’s forces (quartered in Mozhaisk at that time) moved towards Vyazma to offer assistance and defeated the Lithuanians. Then, Kholmsky set out for Dorogobuzh, which had been occupied by a Polish voivode Stanislaw Kiszka. The Russian prince defeated Kiszka’s army, forcing him to flee to Smolensk.

Pursuing the Polish voivode, Vasily Kholmsky captured Dorogobuzh and Starodub and then headed towards Bryansk. Suddenly, he was summoned to Moscow by Vasili III and exiled to Beloozero. Vasily Kholmsky died in a dungeon 15 years later.

1460s births
1524 deaths
Russian nobility
Russian military leaders